The Men Who Lost China is a documentary film created by Mitch Anderson. Released in 2013, the documentary explores the United States' attitude towards China following the 1911 Chinese Revolution and the First World War and how the attitude of other Western nations then helped shape China's national identity, particularly its foreign policy and alignment with the former Soviet Union.

Summary
As today's China is gaining its undisputed superpower status, the world press still speculates over its intentions. The documentary suggests that any worthy prediction must be rooted in the diligent study of past events and the comprehension of the Western and Chinese perception of these events. The US involvement in the Chinese Revolution of 1911 and the perceived Western betrayal in the aftermath of First World War are the two most pivotal points in Chinese modern history that the documentary examines, subtitled into English, Chinese, and Spanish.

Interviewees
Professor Wang Gungwu CBE
Minxin Pei
Professor Richard Baum
Yang Rui

Actors
Dave Hickman (narrator)

See also
Loss of China

References

External links

2013 films
American documentary films
Documentary films about American politics
American independent films
2010s English-language films
2010s American films